Kordon is the name of several rural localities in Russia:
Kordon, Altai Krai, a selo in Kordonsky Selsoviet of Zalesovsky District of Altai Krai
Kordon, Republic of Kalmykia, a settlement in Kevyudovskaya Rural Administration of Iki-Burulsky District of the Republic of Kalmykia
Kordon, Kirov Oblast, a village in Shvetsovsky Rural Okrug of Kumyonsky District of Kirov Oblast
Kordon, Kochenyovsky District, Novosibirsk Oblast, a settlement in Kochenyovsky District, Novosibirsk Oblast
Kordon (Chuvashinsky Rural Settlement), Severny District, Novosibirsk Oblast, a settlement in Severny District, Novosibirsk Oblast; municipally, a part of Chuvashinsky Rural Settlement of that district
Kordon (Biazinsky Rural Settlement), Severny District, Novosibirsk Oblast, a settlement in Severny District, Novosibirsk Oblast; municipally, a part of Biazinsky Rural Settlement of that district
Kordon, Krasnokamsk, Perm Krai, a village under the administrative jurisdiction of the city of krai significance of Krasnokamsk,  Perm Krai
Kordon, Kishertsky District, Perm Krai, a settlement in Kishertsky District, Perm Krai
Kordon, Kosinsky District, Perm Krai, a settlement in Kosinsky District, Perm Krai
Kordon, Samara Oblast, a selo in Khvorostyansky District of Samara Oblast
Kordon, Sverdlovsk Oblast, a settlement under the administrative jurisdiction of the town of Serov, Sverdlovsk Oblast
Kordon, Andreapolsky District, Tver Oblast, a khutor in Andreapolsky District of Tver Oblast
Kordon, Kalininsky District, Tver Oblast, an inhabited locality in Kalininsky District of Tver Oblast
Kordon, Tyumen Oblast, a settlement in Pervomaysky Rural Okrug of Vagaysky District of Tyumen Oblast
Kordon, Vologda Oblast, a settlement in Idsky Selsoviet of Gryazovetsky District of Vologda Oblast